The Suzuki RG150 was a 148 cc two-stroke racing motorcycle produced by Suzuki in Thailand. The bike was produced from 1996 until 2000. In 1998, it was selected as the second-best new motorcycle of 1998 by Motor Trend magazine. 

In South East Asia, it is manufactured  as Suzuki TXR 150 in Malaysia, Suzuki RGR 150 in Indonesia and Suzuki RGV 150  in Thailand .

Overview
The frame of the RG150 was made of box-cut steel and had a banana-shaped rear swingarm. It had a single mono shock on the rear with a single disc brake. The front suspension was a traditional telescopic fork (that could be preloaded) also with a single disc brake and the wheels were tri-spoke Enkei mag-type wheels. The engine was a single-cylinder water-cooled two-stroke engine paired to a six-speed close ratio gearbox with a kick-start. The engine featured AETC (Automatic Exhaust Timing Control), basically a valve in the exhaust port of the engine. At low rpm it restricted the exhaust gases so the engine produced more torque; at high rpm (approx 7,800 rpm), it opened up to increase top end power. The exhaust also had an expansion chamber to give better top-end power. These modified motorcycles have been known to exceed 200 km/h. At such point the gears hit their physical limitations.
The bike featured a full fairing which was unusual for such a small bike.

Specification

Variations
Also available at the time the RG150 was produced was the RGV150, which was a cheaper version with an air-cooled engine and spoke wheels which only had a disc brake on the front. Suzuki FXR150 replaced the RG150 and RGV150. The design of the seat was modified slightly between the two RG150 models (RG150E and RG150ES), 'S' meaning the sport version. The picture above is an 'E' version of the bike.

The European market received the RG125 which is almost identical to the RG150, but with a 123 cc engine of the same design as the RG150. The UK RG125 also had indicators mounted on stalks and the front forks were upside down telescopic.
125 RGfun have a GSXR reversed front fork.
as the 250 RGV with only one brake disc (second brake disc can be mounted)

Interesting the rg150 cylinder could also be fitted to a vj22 Rgv250. This would give a displacement of 300cc.The fairing are almost the same as the 250RGV.

RG150
Motorcycles introduced in 1996
Two-stroke motorcycles